Ruairí Deane (born 3 September 1991) is an Irish Gaelic footballer who plays as a midfielder for the Cork senior team. From the Bantry Blues club, Ruairi works as a teacher. He captained the Cork 2013 Junior Football team to Munster and All-Ireland glory, playing at midfield.

Career statistics

Honours

Bantry Blues
West Cork Under-21 Football Championship (1): 2012
Division 2 Cork County League (1): 2012
Division 3 Cork County League (1): 2010

Cork
All-Ireland Junior Football Championship (1): 2013 (c)
Munster Junior Football Championship (1): 2013 (c)
Munster Under-21 Football Championship (1): 2012
All-Ireland Fresher Football League (1): 2010/11
McGrath Cup (2): 2016, 2018

References

1991 births
Living people
Bantry Blues Gaelic footballers
Cork inter-county Gaelic footballers